Edward Dutkiewicz (1 April 1961 – 9 December 2007) was a British visual artist known for his use of bright colours and abstract forms, reminiscent of Calder and Matisse.

Life and work
Dutkiewicz was born of wartime Polish immigrant parents in Tamworth, Staffordshire on 1 April 1961.

Dutkiewicz was a self-taught artist, between 1986 and 1994 producing wall paintings and murals for the London Borough of Tower Hamlets. He had two solo shows at Flowers East gallery in Hackney. Later he exhibited in Paris, Cologne, Stockholm and San Francisco. Though remaining relatively unknown he was a "serious" artist, producing expressionistic paintings and abstract sculptures.

He received a number of commissions for his work, from the architect Piers Gough who placed one of his polished steel sculptures at Camden Lock and from the Estorick Collection in Islington for a female portrait to be placed in their garden. Several works were installed at the Chelsea and Westminster Hospital. Dutkiewicz sold several of his collages via the Paintings in Hospitals charity.

Dutkiewicz fought a battle with multiple sclerosis, which he was diagnosed with aged 21. By the age of 40 was no longer able to exhibit. For the last six months he was unable to use his hands at all and contemplated suicide. He died in London on 9 December 2007.

In an obituary of Dutkiewicz, the collector Michael Estorick concluded that "if there are echoes of Alexander Calder and Matisse in his use of bright colour and abstract form, it is also of their playfulness and joy. For sure, no one who has experienced so much pain has also expressed as much fun and the pleasure of simply being alive, or, for that matter, has given so much to those around him."

References

ArtFacts

1961 births
2007 deaths
People from Tamworth, Staffordshire
20th-century British painters
British male painters
21st-century British painters
British people of Polish descent
Neurological disease deaths in England
Deaths from multiple sclerosis
20th-century British sculptors
British male sculptors
20th-century British male artists
21st-century British male artists